Antiville may refer to:

Antiville, County Antrim, Northern Ireland, a townland 
Antiville, Indiana, United States, an unincorporated community